The 1986–87 Northeastern Huskies men's basketball team represented Northeastern University during the 1985–86 college basketball season. Led by first-year head coach Karl Fogel, the Huskies competed in the ECAC North Conference and played their home games at Matthews Arena. They finished the season 27–7 overall with a 17–1 mark in ECAC North play to win the regular season conference title. The Huskies one conference loss split two separate 11-game win streaks. They followed the regular season by winning the ECAC North Conference tournament to earn a bid to the NCAA tournament as No. 14 seed in the East region. The Huskies were defeated in the opening round by No. 3 seed Purdue, 104–95.

Senior Reggie Lewis was awarded the ECAC North Player of the Year for the third consecutive season. He would finish as the school's all-time leading scorer and was drafted by the Boston Celtics with the 22nd pick in the 1987 NBA draft.

Roster

Schedule and results

|-
!colspan=9 style=| Regular season

|-
!colspan=9 style=| ECAC North tournament

|-
!colspan=9 style=| NCAA Tournament

Rankings

Awards and honors
 Reggie Lewis – ECAC North Player of the Year (3x)

NBA draft

References

Northeastern Huskies men's basketball seasons
Northeastern
Northeastern